Mermaid Tavern is a historic home located at Newark, New Castle County, Delaware.  The original section was built about 1725, and is a two-story, stuccoed stone structure with  frame additions. The frame additions were built about 1750 and early 19th century.  It has served not only as a tavern, but also as a polling place and as a post office.

It was added to the National Register of Historic Places in 1973.

References

Commercial buildings on the National Register of Historic Places in Delaware
Commercial buildings completed in 1725
Buildings and structures in Newark, Delaware
1725 establishments in Delaware
National Register of Historic Places in New Castle County, Delaware